Ulmus 'Amsterdam' is a Dutch cultivar raised at the Huis Groeneveld in Baarn before 1950, possibly from an open pollination of the early Dutch cultivar 'Bea Schwarz', and introduced by Albert Hoekstra, former director of Amsterdam's horticulture department.

Description
'Amsterdam' is a small tree, generally columnar in shape. The leaves, which are of average size for an elm, turn a rich yellow in autumn and remain attached to the tree for a period much longer than is normal for the genus. The tree is also distinguished by its trunk, which widens conspicuously at the base.

Pests and diseases
The tree is reputed to have a 'notable' resistance to Dutch elm disease,.

Cultivation
'Amsterdam' is perceived to be a tree ideally suited to urban locations where trees of small size are preferred. The cultivar has had only a very limited impact on the Dutch townscape, largely restricted to the streets of Amsterdam, notably the Weesperstraat. The tree is little known beyond the Netherlands.

Etymology
Named for the city of Amsterdam.

Accessions

Europe
Grange Farm Arboretum, Sutton St. James, Spalding, Lincs., UK. Acc. no. 815.
Sir Harold Hillier Gardens, UK. One specimen bordering Crookhill overflow parking area. Acc. no. 2017.0371

Nurseries

Europe
Noordplant , Glimmen, Netherlands.

References

Hybrid elm cultivar
Ulmus articles with images